Chih Chin-shui (born 2 April 1963) is a Taiwanese table tennis player. He competed in the men's doubles event at the 1988 Summer Olympics.

References

1963 births
Living people
Taiwanese male table tennis players
Olympic table tennis players of Taiwan
Table tennis players at the 1988 Summer Olympics
Place of birth missing (living people)